The Customs Convention on the Temporary Importation of Commercial Road Vehicles is a 1956 United Nations multilateral treaty. In states that adhere to the Convention, it allows commercial road vehicles—such as taxis, buses, and semi-trailer trucks—to temporarily travel within the country duty free.

The Convention was concluded in Geneva on 18 May 1956 and was patterned after the Customs Convention on the Temporary Importation of Private Road Vehicles. It was concluded on the same day as the Customs Convention on Containers and the Customs Convention on the Temporary Importation for Private Use of Aircraft and Pleasure Boats.

The Convention entered into force on 8 April 1959. It was signed by 12 states and as of 2013 has 42 parties, which includes 41 United Nations member states plus the European Union.

The Convention was somewhat superseded in 1990 by the Istanbul Convention, which combines in one single instrument the various conventions on the temporary admission of specific goods.

See also 
 ATA Carnet

External links
Text
Ratifications

1956 in Switzerland
1956 in transport
International road transport
Customs treaties
Transport treaties
Treaties concluded in 1956
Treaties entered into force in 1959
United Nations treaties
Treaties of the Democratic Republic of Afghanistan
Treaties of Algeria
Treaties of Austria
Treaties of Azerbaijan
Treaties of Belgium
Treaties of Bosnia and Herzegovina
Treaties of the People's Republic of Bulgaria
Treaties of the Kingdom of Cambodia (1953–1970)
Treaties of Croatia
Treaties of Cuba
Treaties of Cyprus
Treaties of Denmark
Treaties entered into by the European Union
Treaties of Finland
Treaties of France
Treaties of West Germany
Treaties of the Kingdom of Greece
Treaties of the Hungarian People's Republic
Treaties of Ireland
Treaties of Italy
Treaties of Kyrgyzstan
Treaties of Lithuania
Treaties of Luxembourg
Treaties of Montenegro
Treaties of New Zealand
Treaties of Norway
Treaties of the Polish People's Republic
Treaties of the Estado Novo (Portugal)
Treaties of Moldova
Treaties of the Socialist Republic of Romania
Treaties of Saudi Arabia
Treaties of Serbia and Montenegro
Treaties of Sierra Leone
Treaties of Singapore
Treaties of Slovenia
Treaties of Francoist Spain
Treaties of Sweden
Treaties of Switzerland
Treaties of North Macedonia
Treaties of Turkey
Treaties of the United Kingdom
Treaties of Uzbekistan
Treaties of Yugoslavia
Treaties extended to the Faroe Islands
Treaties extended to Greenland
Treaties extended to West Berlin
Treaties extended to Liechtenstein
Treaties extended to Guernsey
Treaties extended to the Isle of Man
Treaties extended to Jersey
Treaties extended to Brunei (protectorate)
Treaties extended to Gibraltar
Treaties extended to the Colony of North Borneo
Treaties extended to the Crown Colony of Seychelles
Treaties extended to the Crown Colony of Singapore
Treaties extended to British Somaliland
Treaties extended to British Cyprus
Treaties extended to the Gambia Colony and Protectorate
Treaties extended to the Colony of Sierra Leone
Treaties extended to British Hong Kong
Treaties extended to British Kenya
Treaties extended to the Uganda Protectorate